Rialto is a city in San Bernardino County, California, United States, 56 miles east of Los Angeles, near the Cajon Pass, Interstate 15, Interstate 10, State Route 210 and Metrolink routes.

Its population was 104,026 as of the 2020 Census, up from 99,171 at the 2010 Census. Its population and economic activity have grown rapidly in recent years due to the building of major distribution centers in the region.

The U.S. Army Rialto Ammunition Storage point was used during World War II to support operations in the Pacific theater.

Rialto is home to major regional distribution centers: Staples Inc., which serves stores across the entire West Coast of the United States, Amazon (company), Under Armour, Medline Industries, Niagara Bottling, Monster Energy and Target in the northern region of the city, in the Las Colinas community. One of the United States' largest fireworks companies, Pyro Spectaculars, is also headquartered in Rialto.

History

Ancient artifacts discovered by archaeologists suggest that what is now the city of Rialto was settled prior to 1500. Such artifacts, now found at the Rialto Historical Society, indicate that the Serrano Indians lived in the Rialto area between 1500 and 1800 AD.

An adobe building from the early 19th century, which has been used for many purposes over the years, is the oldest building still standing in Rialto and stands restored near Bud Bender Park, formerly known as "Lilac Park" on Second Street and Riverside Avenue.

In 1842, the Lugo family was granted the Rancho San Bernardino—a holding of 37,700 acres—which encompassed Rialto. In 1851, the Mountain Family purchased part of the Lugo family's Rancho San Bernardino, and claimed several other portions of the ranch which later became known as Rialto. This claim was later amended by the United States Government, permitting them a smaller fraction of the initial purchase.

In 1887 a railroad connector line was built between San Bernardino and Pasadena by the Santa Fe Railroad. Along the line, townsites were located every  [mile and a half] and by the fall of that year over 25 new towns were being built. This same year the Semitropic Land and Water Company was formed to organize the purchase and selling of real estate, water, and water rights and privileges. A Methodist colony developed which was named after the Rialto Bridge in Venice, Italy, considered a central meeting place for Venetians.

In the fall of 1888, the first school was built and Brooke School District was formed. Records show that up until 1920, the Brooke School District was in continuous operation, except for a very short time in 1888. The prominent Rialto Trapp family bought the first school house in 1921, remodeled the building, and members of the family resided in it until it was destroyed by fire. The Rialto School District (today Rialto Unified School District), was formed in 1891. The staff consisted of two teachers and a principal with separate play areas for the boys and girls.

In 1901 a cemetery was established in the township. It is administered by the City Treasurer.

The Chamber of Commerce was established in 1907. The Chamber incorporated in the spring of 1911. By 1911 the population had grown to 1,500 with 40 businesses and a local newspaper. The election results on October 31 of the same year were 135 votes for the incorporation of the city and 72 against.

Foothill Boulevard was repaired in 1913 and became U.S. Route 66, a section of the U.S. highway system. In 1914 Los Angeles' Pacific Electric Railway completed its San Bernardino Line through the City of Rialto, with a junction at Riverside Avenue for the Riverside Line. Today the Tracks above First Street are a part of the Union Pacific and the Pacific Electric depot on Riverside Avenue is Cuca's Restaurant.

A fire in the 1920s swept through and destroyed many of the buildings in the downtown area.

The U.S. Army Rialto Ammunition Storage point which was used during World War II to support operations in the Pacific theater. The  was operated between 1941-1945 and the land later sold to defense contractors and private corporations. The site is a Superfund Site that was scheduled to begin remediation in 2020.

In the late 1990s, the city's drinking water was contaminated by perchlorate leaking from a  site owned by a defense contractors and fireworks manufacturer that handles perchlorate salts and hazardous materials. The city launched lawsuits against 42 parties.  The United States Environmental Protection Agency designed a groundwater pump and treatment system to remove and clean contaminated water, and negotiated settlements to several lawsuits. Cleanup costs reached $100 million in 2014, and a pumping station was estimated to begin treating contaminated water between 2020 and 2021.

Geography

Climate

Rialto, also known as "Bridge City," experiences a Mediterranean climate, with mild, relatively wet winters and hot, dry summers.

The particularly arid climate during the summer prevents tropospheric clouds from forming, meaning temperatures rise to what is considered Class Orange by NOAA. Rialto gets an average of 16 inches (410 mm) of rain, and most of this rainfall precipitates in winter. However, most of the city is out of snowfall's path.

The seasonal Santa Ana winds are felt particularly strongly in not only Rialto but the greater San Bernardino area as warm and dry air is channeled through nearby Cajon Pass at times during the autumn months. This phenomenon markedly increases the wildfire danger in the foothill, canyon, and mountain communities that the cycle of cold, wet winters and dry summers helps create.

Demographics

2000
As of the census of 2000, there were 91,873 people, 24,659 households, and 20,516 families residing in the city. The population density was 1,622.0/km2 (4,200.7/mi2). There were 26,045 housing units at an average density of 459.8/km2 (1,190.9/mi2). The racial makeup of the city was 39.37% White, 22.27% African American, 1.05% Native American, 2.47% Asian, 0.43% Pacific Islander, 29.20% from other races, and 5.21% from two or more races. 51.21% of the population were Hispanic or Latino of any race.

There were 24,659 households, out of which 52.8% had children under the age of 18 living with them, 57.6% were married couples living together, 18.6% had a female householder with no husband present, and 16.8% were non-families. 13.4% of all households were made up of individuals, and 5.4% had someone living alone who was 65 years of age or older. The average household size was 3.69 and the average family size was 4.01.

In the city, the population was spread out, with 37.7% under the age of 18, 10.4% from 18 to 24, 29.1% from 25 to 44, 16.4% from 45 to 64, and 6.4% who were 65 years of age or older. The median age was 26 years. For every 100 females, there were 95.6 males. For every 100 females age 18 and over, there were 90.7 males.

The median income for a household in the city was $41,254, and the median income for a family was $42,638. Males had a median income of $34,110 versus $26,640 for females. The per capita income for the city was $13,375. 17.4% of the population and 13.8% of families were below the poverty line. Out of the total population, 21.7% of those under the age of 18 and 9.7% of those 65 and older were living below the poverty line.

2010
The 2010 United States Census reported that Rialto had a population of 99,171. The racial makeup of Rialto was 43,592 (44.0%) White (12.6% Non-Hispanic White), 16,236 (16.4%) African American, 1,062 (1.1%) Native American, 2,258 (2.3%) Asian, 361 (0.4%) Pacific Islander, 30,993 (31.3%) from other races, and 4,669 (4.7%) from two or more races. Hispanic or Latino of any race were 67,038 persons (67.6%).

The Census reported that 98,724 people (99.5% of the population) lived in households, 254 (0.3%) lived in non-institutionalized group quarters, and 193 (0.2%) were institutionalized.

There were 25,202 households, out of which 14,384 (57.1%) had children under the age of 18 living in them, 13,811 (54.8%) were opposite-sex married couples living together, 5,175 (20.5%) had a female householder with no husband present, 2,191 (8.7%) had a male householder with no wife present. There were 1,780 (7.1%) unmarried opposite-sex partnerships, and 150 (0.6%) same-sex married couples or partnerships. 3,141 households (12.5%) were made up of individuals, and 1,283 (5.1%) had someone living alone who was 65 years of age or older. The average household size was 3.92. There were 21,177 families (84.0% of all households); the average family size was 4.20.

The population was spread out, with 32,604 people (32.9%) under the age of 18, 12,204 people (12.3%) aged 18 to 24, 26,802 people (27.0%) aged 25 to 44, 20,655 people (20.8%) aged 45 to 64, and 6,906 people (7.0%) who were 65 years of age or older. The median age was 28.3 years. For every 100 females, there were 94.7 males. For every 100 females age 18 and over, there were 92.1 males.

The homeowner vacancy rate was 3.1%; the rental vacancy rate was 9.7%. 64,148 people (64.7% of the population) lived in owner-occupied housing units and 34,576 people (34.9%) lived in rental housing units.

According to the 2010 U.S. Census, Rialto had a median household income of $49,428, with 19.2% of the population living below the federal poverty line.

Crime

Rialto's crime rate was slightly above the national average every year from 1999 to 2007. From 2008 to 2016, the crime rate in Rialto was below the national average. In 2006, Rialto fielded 0.89 police officers per 1,000 residents, less than one-third the national average. Rialto was the first city in the United States to require that all police officers wear body cameras.

Government

State and federal representation

City
The mayor is Deborah Robertson, and the city manager is Rod Foster.

2005 recall election
On September 13, 2005, the Rialto city council voted to dissolve the Rialto Police Department and replace it with a contract with the San Bernardino County sheriff's department. Soon after the vote, a San Bernardino County court issued an injunction on the change because the vote was done in secret. As a result, two city council members, Ed Scott and Winfred Lee Hansen, were up for recall. In March 2006, city leaders decided to keep the police department.

Education
Rialto is served by the Rialto Unified School District. It has a Christian School called Bloomington Christian School for junior high and high school. It also has preschool through 8th grade hosted by Calvary Chapel Rialto. Rialto is also home to a private Catholic school (preschool through 8th grade). St. Catherine of Siena Parish School is located on Sycamore Avenue. The western portion of Rialto is served by Fontana Unified School District while the southern portion of Rialto is served by Colton Joint Unified School District.

Rialto is also served by the San Bernardino Community College District. San Bernardino Valley College is the closest SBCCD campus to the city.

In 1994, the Rialto Western Little League hosted the Southern California Championship for the Major Division, in which the winner went on to participate in the Regional Tournament. The winner was Northridge City Little League who went on to play in the Little League World Series in South Williamsport, Pennsylvania. The Tournament was held at Lilac Park, now known as Bud Bender Park.

Media
Rialto Network is a public, educational, and government access (PEG) cable television station based in Rialto. The station was created in 1991 as KRTO (KRialTO) and in 2012 the station was renamed Rialto Network. Rialto Network is located in the Civic Center and the station is cablecast daily on Spectrum Cable cable system on Channels 3, and on AT&T U-verse PEG cable TV channel 99. It is also webcast.

Infrastructure

Transportation
The City of Rialto is situated between Interstate 10 and State Route 210. Average commute times from Rialto are between 33.6 and 37.6 minutes.

Rialto is served by the Metrolink regional rail service on the Metrolink San Bernardino Line at Rialto station. The San Bernardino Line takes approximately one hour and twenty minutes to commute each way to Los Angeles and ten minutes to San Bernardino. The same trip by car via the 10 or 210 freeways takes between 45 minutes and 2 hours, depending on traffic.

Notable people
 Alex Acker, professional basketball player (second round pick)
 Nick Barnett, professional football player for the Green Bay Packers
 Victor Butler, professional football player for the New Orleans Saints
 Ted Chronopoulos, retired soccer player
 Ryan Clady, professional football player for the Denver Broncos
Kenny Clark, professional football player for the Green Bay Packers
 Jeff Conine, retired professional baseball player for the Florida Marlins
 George Connor (1906–2001), race car driver
 Wilson Cruz, actor (My So Called Life, Party of Five)
 Kirk Fogg, actor, game show host and singer, 1977 graduate of Eisenhower High School.
 Clarence Gilyard Jr., actor (Matlock and Walker, Texas Ranger)
 Marvelle Harris, professional basketball player for the Illawarra Hawks
 J. J. Fad, hip hop group
 Rodney King, African-American taxi driver whose videotaped beating by police in 1991 was the catalyst for the 1992 Los Angeles Riots
 Mélange Lavonne, singer
 Ronnie Lott, Hall of Fame football player, primarily for the San Francisco 49ers, 1981–94
 Ricky Nolasco, professional baseball player for the Los Angeles Angels
 David Ray, poet
 John Singleton, film director, screenwriter, producer
 Twyla Tharp, choreographer and dancer, raised in Rialto
 Randy Thomas, songwriter and guitarist for Sweet Comfort Band, co-founder of Allies
 Lisa Marie Varon, professional wrestler
 Josh Whitesell, professional baseball player for the Arizona Diamondbacks
 Jamaal Williams, professional football player for the Detroit Lions

References

External links

 
 Rialto Chamber of Commerce

 
1911 establishments in California
Cities in San Bernardino County, California
Incorporated cities and towns in California
Populated places established in 1911
Populated places in San Bernardino County, California
Chicano and Mexican neighborhoods in California